Events in 1992 in animation.

Events

January
 January 9: The Simpsons episode "Radio Bart" is first broadcast, guest starring Sting.
 January 23: The Simpsons episode "Lisa the Greek" is first broadcast.
 January 27: During a rally of the Republican Party, President George H. W. Bush states that "the American Family (...) needs to be a lot more like The Waltons and a lot less like The Simpsons."Brooks, James L. (2004). "Bush vs. Simpsons", in The Simpsons: The Complete Fourth Season [DVD]. 20th Century Fox.
 January 30: At the start of the very next The Simpsons episode, a short video is shown in which the Simpson family watches Bush's speech on television. In response to it, Bart Simpson says: "Hey, we're just like the Waltons: we pray for an end to the depression too".

February
 February 6: The Simpsons episode "Homer Alone" is first broadcast.
 February 13: The Simpsons episode "Bart the Lover" is first broadcast.
 February 20: The Simpsons episode "Homer at the Bat" is first broadcast, guest starring various famous baseball players including Wade Boggs, Jose Canseco, Roger Clemens, Ken Griffey Jr., Don Mattingly, Steve Sax, Mike Scioscia, Ozzie Smith and Darryl Strawberry as well as Terry Cashman.
 February 27: The Simpsons episode "Separate Vocations" is first broadcast.

March
 March 7: The first episode of Sailor Moon airs in Japan.
 March 11: Tiny Toon Adventures: How I Spent My Vacation premiers.
 March 12: The Simpsons episode "Dog of Death" is first broadcast.
 March 26: The Simpsons episode "Colonel Homer" is first broadcast, guest starring Beverly D'Angelo as Lurleen Lumpkin.
 March 30: 64th Academy Awards:
 Beauty and the Beast becomes the first animated feature film to be nominated for the Academy Award for Best Picture during the 64th Academy Awards. It loses to The Silence of the Lambs, but wins the Academy Award for Best Original Score and the Academy Award for Best Original Song.
 Manipulation by Daniel Greaves wins the Academy Award for Best Animated Short Film.
 Ray Harryhausen wins the Gordon E. Sawyer Award (also known as the Lifetime Achievement Academy Award).

April
 April 9: The Simpsons episode "Black Widower" is first broadcast.
 April 10: Bill Kroyer's FernGully: The Last Rainforest premiers.
 April 20: The first episode of Goof Troop airs.
 April 23: The Simpsons episode "The Otto Show" is first broadcast, guest starring the band Spinal Tap.

May
May 7: The Simpsons episode "Bart's Friend Falls in Love" is first broadcast.

July
 July 10: Ralph Bakshi's Cool World, which mixes live-action with animation, premieres, but flops at the box office.
 July 18: Hayao Miyazaki's Porco Rosso premieres.
 July 31: Bruce W. Smith's Bébé's Kids is first released.

August
 August 15: The Ren & Stimpy Show episode "Powdered Toast Man" premieres, guest starring Frank Zappa as the Pope.
 August 20: Friz Freleng receives a star at the Hollywood Walk of Fame.
 August 27: The Simpsons episode "Brother, Can You Spare Two Dimes?" is first broadcast, guest starring Danny DeVito as Herb Powell.

September
 September 4: Bill Plympton's The Tune premiers.
 September 5: The first episode of Batman: The Animated Series airs. 
 September 11: 
 The Batman: The Animated Series episode "Joker's Favor" premieres, in which Harley Quinn makes her debut. She will become so popular that she will be added to the regular cast of the Batman franchise. 
 The first episode of The Little Mermaid airs.
 September 12: The first episode of Eek! The Cat airs.
 September 17: The first episode of Noddy's Toyland Adventures airs.
 September 22: The animated short Frog Baseball first airs on television. It marks the debut of Beavis and Butt-Head, who will receive their own series a year later.
 September 24: The Simpsons episode "Kamp Krusty" is first broadcast.

October
 October 1: 
 Cartoon Network is launched in the United States by Turner Broadcasting System.
 The film Tom and Jerry: The Movie premieres.
 The Simpsons episode "A Streetcar Named Marge" is first broadcast.
 October 8: The Simpsons episode "Homer the Heretic" is first broadcast.
 October 14: A Bunch of Munsch episode "The Paper Bag Princess" is first broadcast on Showtime.
 October 15: The Simpsons episode "Lisa the Beauty Queen" is first broadcast, guest starring Bob Hope and Lona Williams.  
 October 29:
 The Little Punker premieres.
 The Simpsons episode "Treehouse of Horror III" is first broadcast.

November
 November 3: The Simpsons episode "Itchy & Scratchy: The Movie" is first broadcast with Bumblebee Man making his debut.
 November 5: The Simpsons episode "Marge Gets a Job" is first broadcast, guest starring Tom Jones.
 November 12: The Simpsons episode "New Kid on the Block" is first broadcast with Captain Horatio McCallister and Ruth Powers making their debuts.
 November 19: The Simpsons episode "Mr. Plow" is first broadcast, guest starring Linda Ronstadt and Adam West.
 November 25: Aladdin by Ron Clements and John Musker, produced by the Walt Disney Company, premieres.

December
 December 2: A Bunch of Munsch aired its final episode on Showtime.
 December 3: The Simpsons episode "Lisa's First Word" is first broadcast, guest starring Elizabeth Taylor as Maggie Simpson.
 December 7: What's Opera, Doc? is added to the National Film Registry.
 December 8: Trey Parker and Matt Stone make the animated short Jesus vs. Frosty, which features embryonal versions of the characters that will later appear in South Park.
 December 17: The Simpsons episode "Homer's Triple Bypass" is first broadcast.

Specific date unknown
 Film Roman takes over production of The Simpsons from Klasky Csupo.
 Jan Švankmajer's Food is first released.
 The Spanish film The Legend of the North Wind premiers.
 The first episode of Cococinel airs.

Films released

 January 8 - Evil Toons (United States)
 January 25 - Sangokushi (dai 1-bu): Eiyū-tachi no Yoake (Japan)
 February 4 - Kkulbeorui chingu (South Korea)
 February 11 - Boyfriend (Japan)
 February 14 - The Magic Voyage (Germany)
 March 7:
 Doraemon: Nobita and the Kingdom of Clouds (Japan)
 Dragon Ball Z: The Return of Cooler (Japan)
 Magical Taruruto: Good Good Hot Grilled Octopus! (Japan)
 March 11 - Tiny Toon Adventures: How I Spent My Vacation (United States)
 March 14 - Soreike! Anpanman Tsumiki-jō no Himitsu (Japan)
 April 10 - FernGully: The Last Rainforest (United States and Australia)
 April 21 - Joker - Marginal City (Japan)
 April 25 - The Tune (United States)
 April 27 - Aladdin (United States)
 May 1 - The Jungle Book (United Kingdom)
 May 2 - Midori (Japan)
 May 4 - Beauty and the Beast (United States)
 May 10 - Ramayana: The Legend of Prince Rama (India and Japan)
 May 11 - Pinocchio (United States)
 May 18 - Sinbad (United States)
 June 1 -  The Three Musketeers (United States)
 June 3 - Spirit of Wonder: Miss China's Ring (Japan)
 June 8 - Thumbelina (United States)
 July 1:
 Seikima II: Humane Society -Jinruiai ni Michita Shakai- (Japan)
 Shiritsu Tantei Toki Shozo no Trouble Note - Hard & Loose (Japan)
 July 4 - The Elephant Train Has Arrived (Japan)
 July 10 - Cool World (United States)
 July 11:
 Dragon Ball Z: Super Android 13! (Japan)
 Senbon Matsubara: Kawa to Ikiru Shōnen-tachi (Japan)
 July 18:
 Porco Rosso (Japan)
 Silent Möbius 2 (Japan)
 The Weathering Continent (Japan)
 July 21:
 Iron Virgin Jun (Japan)
 Mikeneko Holmes: The Lord of Ghost Castle (Japan)
 July 22 - Hōkago no Tinker Bell (Japan)
 July 24:
 Lupin III: From Russia with Love (Japan)
 Raven Tengu Kabuto: The Golden-Eyed Beast (Japan)
 July 25 - Run Melos! (Japan)
 July 31 - Bébé's Kids (United States)
 August 1 - Yawara! Go Get 'Em, Wimpy Kids!! (Japan)
 August 8 - Comet in Moominland (Japan)
 August 14 - Freddie as F.R.O.7 (United Kingdom)
 August 21 - Delinquent in Drag (Japan)
 August 22 - Tottoi (Japan)
 August 29 - Mobile Suit Gundam 0083: The Last Blitz of Zeon (Japan)
 September 17 - Blinky Bill: The Mischievous Koala (Australia)
 October 1 - Tom and Jerry: The Movie (United States)
 October 8 - The New Adventures of Little Toot (United States and Canada)
 October 29 - The Little Punker (Germany)
 November 16 - Aladdin (United Kingdom)
 November 21 - Fūma no Kojirō Saishushou: Fuma Hanran-hen (Japan)
 November 25 - Aladdin (United States)
 December 11 - Oishinbo: Kyūkyoku Tai Shikō, Chōju Ryōri Taiketsu!! (Japan)
 December 12:
 The Appleland Story (Japan)
 Legend of the Galactic Heroes: Golden Wings (Japan)
 December 19 - Chibi Maruko-chan: My Favorite Song (Japan)
 December 23:
 Beyond the Mind's Eye (United States)
 Fatal Fury: Legend of the Hungry Wolf (Japan)
 Specific date unknown:
 Beauty and the Beast (United Kingdom)
 Cinderella (United Kingdom)
 The Legend of the North Wind (Spain)
 Mitki-Mayer (Russia)
 The New Adventures of Robin Hood (Australia)
 The New Adventures of William Tell (Australia)
 The Pied Piper of Hamlin (Australia)
 Tomcat's Big Adventure (Japan)

Television series debuts

Television series endings

Births

February 
 February 10: Karen Fukuhara, American actress (voice of the title character in Kipo and the Age of Wonderbeasts, Glimmer in She-Ra and the Princesses of Power, Sewer Queen and Alexis in Craig of the Creek).
 February 18: Logan Miller, American actor (voice of Nova in Ultimate Spider-Man and Guardians of the Galaxy, Johnny in Phineas and Ferb).

March 
 March 3: Nick Dahan, American television writer and production assistant (The Simpsons).
 March 27: Aoi Yūki, Japanese actress (voice of Madoka Kamane in Puella Magi Madoka Magica, Hibiki Tachibana in Symphogear, Iris in Pokémon, Tsuyu Asui / Froppy in My Hero Academia, Nodoka Hanadera / Cure Grace in Healin' Good Pretty Cure, Futaba Sakura in Persona 5: The Animation, Japanese dub voice of Sticks in Sonic Boom and Gwen Stacy / Spider-Woman in Spider-Man: Into the Spider-Verse).

April 
 April 18: Chloe Bennet, American actress and singer (voice of Chase in Tinker Bell and the Legend of the NeverBeast, Daisy Johnson / Quake in Marvel Rising, Yi in Abominable and Abominable and the Invisible City).
 April 24: Jack Quaid, American actor (voice of Pilot in Smallfoot, Ensign Brad Boimler in Star Trek: Lower Decks, Richie Rich in seasons 3-4 of Harvey Girls Forever!, Alberto Falcone in Batman: The Long Halloween, Tanner in the Solar Opposites episode "The Rad Awesome Terrific Ray").
 April 27: Morgan Berry, American actress (voice of Rindo Kobayashi in Food Wars!: Shokugeki no Soma, Thirteen in My Hero Academia, Daymond in The Seven Deadly Sins, Sharley in One Piece, Vivica in the Miraculous: Tales of Ladybug & Cat Noir episode "Desperada").

May 
 May 17: Jules Medcraft, American actress (voice of Adam in Bigfoot Family, Andrea Davenport in The Ghost and Molly McGee).
 May 18: Spencer Breslin, American actor and musician (voice of Crandall in Teamo Supremo, Cubby in Return to Never Land, Anthony in Quantum Quest: A Cassini Space Odyssey).
 May 21: Olivia Olson, American singer and actress (voice of Vanessa Doofenshmirtz in Phineas and Ferb, Marceline in Adventure Time, Bliss in The Powerpuff Girls).
 May 29: Erica Lindbeck, American actress (voice of Jane Foster in Avengers Assemble, Emira Blight in The Owl House, Cheetara and Wilykit in ThunderCats Roar, Mera in DC Super Hero Girls, Loona and Millie in Helluva Boss, Kaori Miyazono in Your Lie in April, Natalie Miller / Glitter Ace in Glitter Force Doki Doki, Futaba Sakura in Persona 5: The Animation, voice of Barbie from 2015 to 2017).

June
 June 14:
 Daryl Sabara, American actor (voice of Rex Salazar in Generator Rex, Hunter in Father of the Pride, Hero Boy in The Polar Express, Heatblast in Ben 10, Rhino in Ultimate Spider-Man).
 Evan Sabara, American actor (voice of Robin in The Batman, additional voices in Home on the Range, Dinosaur, and My Neighbor Totoro).
 June 28: Konomi Kohara, Japanese actress and voice actress (voice of Akane Mizuno in Tsuki ga Kirei, Yuko Yoshida in The Demon Girl Next Door, Lala Hagoromo/Cure Milky in Star Twinkle PreCure, Mina Hibino in Teasing Master Takagi-san, Kasumi Nomura in Asobi Asobase, Chika Fujiwara in Kaguya-sama: Love Is War, Roxy Migurdia in Mushoku Tensei).

July
 July 5: Kyler Spears, American animator (Lucas Bros. Moving Co., Axe Cop), storyboard artist (Clarence, We Bare Bears), writer (We Bare Bears) and director (Amphibia).
 July 17: Harrison Chad, American actor (voice of Boots in seasons 1-4 of Dora the Explorer and the Go, Diego, Go! episode "Linda the Llama Saves Carnaval", Cardigan in Charlotte's Web 2: Wilbur's Great Adventure, young Tarzan in Tarzan II, singing voice of Leo in Little Einsteins).
 July 22: Selena Gomez, American singer and actress (voice of Princess Selenia in Arthur and the Revenge of Maltazard and Arthur 3: The War of the Two Worlds, Mavis Dracula in the Hotel Transylvania franchise).

August
 August 4:
 Dylan Sprouse, American actor (voice of KB Toys Soldier in Eight Crazy Nights, Justin Magoo in Kung-Fu Magoo, Zam in The Emperor's New School episode "Chipmunky Business").
 Cole Sprouse, American actor and photographer (voice of KB Toys Soldier in Eight Crazy Nights, Brad Landry in Kung-Fu Magoo, Zim in The Emperor's New School episode "Chipmunky Business").
 August 6: Saori Ōnishi, Japanese voice actress (voice of Hisako Arato in Food Wars!: Shokugeki no Soma, Eriri Spencer Sawamura in Saekano: How to Raise a Boring Girlfriend, Ais Wallenstein in Is It Wrong to Try to Pick Up Girls in a Dungeon?, Saphentite Neikes in Monster Girl Doctor, Shikimori in Shikimori's Not Just a Cutie).
 August 20: Demi Lovato, American singer, songwriter, and actress (voice of Smurfette in Smurfs: The Lost Village, Lenore Quinonez in Charming).

September 
 September 27: Sam Lerner, American actor (voice of Zak Saturday in The Secret Saturdays, Chowder in Monster House, King Gristle in Trolls: The Beat Goes On!).

October 
 October 9: Tyler James Williams, American actor (voice of Bobby in Little Bill, Firestorm in Batman: The Brave and the Bold).
 October 12: Josh Hutcherson, American actor and producer (voice of Markl in Howl's Moving Castle, Nod in Epic, Van-El and young Bruce Wayne in the Justice League Unlimited episode "For the Man Who Has Everything").
 October 13: Aaron Dismuke, American actor (voice of Alphonse Eric in Fullmetal Alchemist, Senku Ishigami in Dr. Stone, Tamaki Amajiki / Suneater in My Hero Academia, Shura in YuYu Hakusho, Hibiki in Fairy Tail, Sante in Tokyo Ghoul, Kanji Ike in Classroom of the Elite, Kakeru Manabe in Fruits Basket, Miyuki Shirogane in Kaguya-sama: Love is War, Oscar Pine in RWBY).
 October 15: Vincent Martella, American actor (voice of Phineas Flynn in Phineas and Ferb and the Milo Murphy's Law episode "The Phineas and Ferb Effect", Jason Todd in Batman: Under the Red Hood and Batman: Death in the Family).
 October 28: Vivienne Medrano, Salvadoran-American animator (creator of Hazbin Hotel and Helluva Boss).

November  
 November 23: Miley Cyrus, American singer, songwriter, and actress (voice of Penny in Bolt, Yatta in The Emperor's New School, Celebrity Starr in The Replacements episode "The Frog Prince", Skateboarding Pigeon in the Stone Quackers episode "A Farewell to Kings").

Deaths

January
 January 9: Claude Coats, American painter and animator (Walt Disney Animation Studios, Hanna-Barbera, UPA), dies at age 78. 
 January 10: Babette DeCastro, American singer (Bird and Animal voices in Song of the South), dies at age 66.
 January 15: Walter Clinton, American animator and comics artist (Tex Avery, Hanna-Barbera), dies at age 85.
 January 24: Ken Darby, American composer and conductor (Walt Disney Animation Studios), dies at age 82.

February
 February 4: John Dehner, American animator (Walt Disney Studios, Hanna-Barbera, UPA) and actor, dies at age 76.
 February 9: Jack Kinney, American animator, animation director and producer (Walt Disney Company, Kinney-Adelquist Productions, Hanna-Barbera, UPA), dies at age 82.
 February 14: Alex Lovy, American animator, director and comics artist (Van Beuren, Walter Lantz, Columbia Pictures, Hanna-Barbera), dies at age 78.
 February 20: Dick York, American actor (voice of Darrin Stephens in The Flintstones episode "Samantha"), dies at age 63.

March
 March 4: Art Babbitt, American animator (creator of Goofy, worked for Terrytoons, Walt Disney Company, Hanna-Barbera, and UPA), dies at age 84.
 March 6: Elvia Allman, American actress (second voice of Clarabelle Cow, voice of Miss Cud in I Haven't Got a Hat), dies at age 87.
 March 13: Boris Dyozhkin, Russian film director, caricaturist and animator (Cipollino, Fitil), dies at age 77.
 March 14: Ralph James, American voice actor (voice of narrator in The Unmentionables, Mr. Turtle for Tootsie Pops, Orson in Mork & Mindy/Laverne & Shirley/Fonz Hour, additional voices in Dynomutt, Dog Wonder, Captain Caveman and the Teen Angels, and The Plastic Man Comedy/Adventure Show), dies at age 67.
 March 17: Grace Stafford, American actress (voice of Woody Woodpecker from 1950 to 1991) and wife of Walter Lantz, dies of spinal cancer at age 88.
 March 24: Campbell Grant, American actor (voice of Angus MacBadger in The Adventures of Ichabod and Mr. Toad), character designer and animation writer (Fantasia), dies at age 82.
 March 29: William L. Hendricks, American producer (Looney Tunes), dies at age 87.

April
 April 16: Andy Russell, American-Mexican singer and actor (sang the segment "Without You" in Make Mine Music), dies at age 72.

May
 May 5: Michael J. O'Connor, American animator, storyboard artist (Filmation, Hanna-Barbera, The Simpsons) and writer (DePatie-Freleng Enterprises, Filmation), dies at age 54.
 May 25: Edith Vernick, Ukrainian-American animator (Fleischer Studios), dies at age 86.

June
 June 15: Chuck Menville, American animator and writer (Hanna-Barbera, Tiny Toon Adventures, Batman: The Animated Series), dies at age 52.

July
 July 17: Larry Roberts, American actor (voice of Tramp in Lady and the Tramp), dies at age 65 from AIDS.
 July 18: Rudolph Ising, American film director, producer (co-founder of Warner Bros. Cartoons and Metro-Goldwyn-Mayer cartoon studio) and actor (original voice of Barney Bear), dies at age 88.

August 
 August 8: Lynn Karp, American animator and comics artist (Walt Disney Company), dies at age 82.
 August 23: Charles August Nichols, American animator and film and television director (Walt Disney Company, Hanna-Barbera), dies at age 81.
 August 26: Sammy Timberg, American musician and composer (Fleischer Studios, Famous Studios), dies at age 89.
 August 27: Ferdinand Diehl, German animator and film director (The Seven Ravens, Mecki), dies at age 91.

September 
 September 5: Yasuji Mori, Japanese animator (Toei Animation) and director (The Little Prince and the Eight-Headed Dragon), dies at age 67.
 September 25: Leslie Denison, English actor (voice of the judge and a weasel in The Adventures of Ichabod and Mr. Toad, narrator in Donald's Diary), dies at age 87. 
 September 27: Zhang Leping, Chinese comics artist and animator (Sanmao), dies at age 91.
 September 29: John Reed, American film director (Walt Disney Company, Animal Farm), dies at age 84.

October 
 October 6: Denholm Elliott, English actor (voice of Cowslip in Watership Down), dies at age 70.
 October 16: Shirley Booth, American actress (voice of Mrs. Claus in The Year Without a Santa Claus), dies at age 94.
 October 18: Purv Pullen, American actor (Silly Symphonies, Birds in Snow White and the Seven Dwarfs), dies at age 83.
 October 20: Jackson Weaver, American broadcaster and actor (voice of Smokey Bear), dies at age 72.
 October 25: Roger Miller, American singer and actor (voice of Alan-a-Dale the rooster in Robin Hood), dies at age 56.

November
 November 22: Sterling Holloway, American actor (voice of Mr. Stork in Dumbo, adult Flower in Bambi, Cheshire Cat in Alice in Wonderland, Winnie the Pooh in the Winnie the Pooh franchise, Kaa in The Jungle Book, Roquefort in The Aristocats), dies at age 87.

December 
 December 10: Joan Gardner, American actress (voice of Spunky in The Adventures of Spunky and Tadpole, Mrs. Wetworth in Snorks), dies at age 66. 
 December 17: Horst von Möllendorff, German comics artist, cartoonist and animator (Verwitterte Melodie, Der Schneemann, Hochzeit im Korallenmeer), dies at age 86.
 December 24: Peyo, Belgian comics artist and film director (The Smurfs and the Magic Flute), dies at age 64.
 December 30: Romeo Muller, American screenwriter (Rankin/Bass), dies at age 64.
 December 31: Dianne Jackson, English film director (The Snowman), dies at age 51.

Specific date unknown 
 Fred Abranz, American comics artist and animator (Walt Disney Company), dies at age 81 or 82.
 Wan Chaochen, Chinese film director and producer (Wan Brothers), dies at age 85 or 86.
 Pierre Chivot, French animator and comics artist, dies at age 63 or 64.

See also
1992 in anime

Sources

External links 
Animated works of the year, listed in the IMDb

 
1990s in animation